Obernzell is a municipality in the district of Passau in Bavaria in Germany.

Geography

Geographical location
Obernzell is located in the Donau-Wald region at the Danube River. The middle of the Danube River forms the border with Upper Austria.

Neighboring communities in Bavaria
In Bavaria (Passau district):
 Thyrnau
 Untergriesbach

In Upper Austria:
 Vichtenstein
 Esternberg

Constituent communities

The Obernzell Municipality contains 21 Districts.:
Hammermühle

There are the districts of Ederlsdorf, Kellberg and Obernzell .

History

Originating from a monastery, Obernzell was first owned by the Lords of Griesbach and belonged to Bishopric Passau since 1217 as Griesbach at lower market or low-Griesbach in the cell and it further comprised a unit with Untergriesbach. In 1283, it had a parish, in 1359 it was granted market rights. During this time, processing of clay and graphite was the most important economic factor. In 1516 the Obernzeller graphit melting had their own guilds. Around 1530 was the first time  Hafner cell  named after the potters resident. The crucible prepared consisted of 50% graphite, 40% clay and 10% quartz. They were primarily used by alchemists, metal casters and mints. The crucibles made Obernzell so famous that Bernhard Grueber and Adalbert Müller in 1846 The Bavarian Forest wrote in her book: :

Incorporations

Once an independent municipality, Ederlsdorf was incorporated on July 1, 1972.

Population development
 1970: 3.426 Inhabitants
 1987: 3.425 Inhabitants
 2000: 3.790 Inhabitants
 2011: 3.850 Inhabitants

References

Passau (district)
Populated places on the Danube